Yarrawell Parish is a civil parish of Gregory County, New South Wales  in Warren Shire located at 31°11'04.0"S 147°39'51.0"E. in New South Wales.

References

Parishes of Australia
Parishes of New South Wales